Samia Said Chowdhory (known as Samia Said or Samia Sayeed) is a Bangladeshi model and actress. She was the winner of Lux Channel I Superstar, the most prestigious beauty pageant in Bangladesh, was held in 2012. She started her acting career with the television drama Increment in 2012. Said rose to prominence with her film debut in the 2018 Beglali drama Komola Rocket directed by Noor Imran Mithu, which is an adaptation of two short stories Moulik and Saipras by Bengali writer Shahaduz Zaman.

Early life and career
Samia Said was born in South Shields, England. She completed O Level from St Francis Xavier's Green Herald International School, and then A Level from Oxford International School in Dhaka.  She studied English at North South University.

The first ever music video Samia appeared in was called Anmona by Imran and Naumi.

In 2016, Said appeared in the music video for Khan Asifur Rahman Agun' single "Ekbaro Ki Bhebechho" from the album Tin Tara.

In 2018, she was selected to audition for the female lead in Noor Imran Mithu's film Komola Rocket by its director. Said won the role of a young lady Dishi, the interest of the main character Atik, played by Tauquir Ahmed.

Personal life
Said married to Abu Safat Chowdhury on 18 April 2018.

Filmography

Television

Music video appearances

References

External links

Living people
21st-century Bangladeshi actresses
Bangladeshi female models
Bangladeshi television actresses
Bangladeshi film actresses
Bengali television actresses
Bangladeshi actresses
Reality television participants
North South University alumni
People from Comilla District
Year of birth missing (living people)
People from South Shields
Actresses from Tyne and Wear